John Berlinger Breaux (born March 1, 1944) is an American lobbyist, attorney, and retired politician who was a member of the United States Senate from Louisiana from 1987 until 2005. He was also a member of the U.S. House of Representatives from 1972 to 1987. He was considered one of the more conservative national legislators from the Democratic Party. Breaux was a member of the New Democrat Coalition.

After his congressional tenure, he became a lobbyist, co-founding the Breaux-Lott Leadership Group. The firm was later acquired by law and lobbying firm Patton Boggs, now Squire Patton Boggs.

Early life and career 
Breaux was born in Crowley, Louisiana, on March 1, 1944. He graduated from the University of Southwestern Louisiana (now called the University of Louisiana at Lafayette) in Lafayette in 1964 and from Louisiana State University Law School in Baton Rouge in 1967. After graduation, he practiced law, and then served as an assistant to U.S. Representative Edwin Edwards. He was also a member of Lambda Chi Alpha fraternity.

Congressional career

Breaux was elected as a Democrat to the 92nd United States Congress in a special election on September 30, 1972, to fill the vacancy created by Edwards' resignation in order to become governor. Breaux's campaign manager was Ron Faucheux, later a member of the Louisiana House of Representatives. At the age of twenty-eight, Breaux was the youngest member of the U.S. House of Representatives. Breaux was re-elected with ease to the seven succeeding Congresses and served until January 3, 1987.

He was not a candidate for re-election to the House of Representatives in 1986, but was instead elected as a Democrat to the United States Senate. In the 1986 jungle primary, Breaux finished second (447,328 or 37.3 percent) to Sixth District Republican Congressman W. Henson Moore, III, of Baton Rouge (529,433 or 44.2 percent). State Senator Samuel B. Nunez polled another 73,504 votes (6.7 percent). In the general election, Breaux turned the tables on Moore: 723,586 (52.8 percent) to 646,311 (47.2 percent), a margin of 77,275 ballots. Thereafter, Moore took a sub-Cabinet position with the administration of George H. W. Bush, and Breaux took the Senate seat that he would hold for eighteen years. Breaux was not seriously opposed in the 1992 and 1998 elections. In the latter contest, current state insurance commissioner Jim Donelon opposed Breaux, as did perennial candidate L. D. Knox of Winnsboro, who in 1979 legally changed his name to "None of the Above" Knox to highlight support for the "None of the Above" option on ballots.

On October 15, 1991, Breaux was one of seven Southern Democrats who voted to confirm the nomination of Clarence Thomas to the U.S. Supreme Court in a 52 to 48 vote, the narrowest margin of approval in more than a century.

Breaux was seen as a centrist in a Senate divided along partisan lines, and was frequently sought out by Republican leaders to corral a few Democratic votes when they needed them; conversely he also often served as the Democratic emissary in attempts to gather a few moderate Republicans to win votes on their proposals. He was pro-life and a supporter of Second Amendment rights, though he gradually moderated his position on gun control. He was more conservative on taxes than most in his party and challenged many environmental protections. He voted in favor of the North American Free Trade Agreement (NAFTA), welfare reform, the balanced budget amendment, and tighter bankruptcy laws. He was a key Democratic supporter of Republican attempts to abolish the estate tax and in 2001 was among the minority of Democrats to support Bush's tax cut and opposed virtually all attempts by Democrats to alter it. However Breaux had voted with the majority of Democrats in favor of the 1993 Budget. In 2003 he submitted an amendment to reduce the tax cut to $350 billion. In 1995 he notably voted twice with more liberal elements of his party against the widely approved lawsuit reform measures, the Common Sense Product Liability and Legal Reform Act and the Private Securities Litigation Reform Act. Both acts were vetoed by President Bill Clinton, although the second act was passed over his veto.

On June 22, 2004, Breaux cast the lone vote against amendment, S.A. 3464, which would increase the maximum fine from $27,500 to $275,000 when the FCC determines a broadcaster is guilty of "obscene, indecent or profane language." Breaux also opposed the loosening of FCC rules that would allow cross-media platforms in the same community to fall under a single owner.

In 1993, Breaux was elected by Senate Democrats as Deputy Majority Whip, a position he held until his retirement. He also held a number of key Senate committee positions. A senior member of the Finance Committee, Senator Breaux served as the Chairman of the Subcommittee on Social Security and Family Policy. From his position on the Finance Committee, he helped build the coalition that passed welfare reform and health insurance reform bills in 1996. He also pushed for a reduction in the capital gains tax and for tax relief for college education expenses. In 1998, Breaux was selected by the White House and House and Senate leaders to chair the National Bipartisan Commission on the Future of Medicare. Also in 1998, Senator Breaux co-chaired the National Commission on Retirement Policy, which produced legislation to help reform Social Security.

Breaux was the principal architect of the $400 billion Medicare Prescription Drug Modernization Act.

Breaux was a founder of the bipartisan Senate Centrist Coalition and served as chairman of the Democratic Leadership Council.

Breaux's state director and press secretary was the journalist Robert "Bob" Mann, who holds the
Douglas Manship Chair of Journalism at Louisiana State University.

In the 2003 Louisiana gubernatorial campaign, after flirting briefly with the possibility of running himself, Breaux campaigned hard for the successful Democratic candidate, Kathleen Babineaux Blanco of Lafayette. That same year, Breaux was inducted into the Louisiana Political Museum and Hall of Fame in Winnfield.

He announced that he would not run for re-election in 2004; by most accounts he was so popular that it was believed he would have easily won a fourth term had he chosen to run again. He was succeeded in the Senate by Republican David Vitter of suburban New Orleans. Despite Breaux's popularity, he was unable to dictate his successor in the Senate, as Russell Long and J. Bennett Johnston, Jr. had done. He endorsed Democrat Chris John, the U.S. representative from the seventh district, which Breaux had once represented. However, John came second in the jungle primary to Republican David Vitter. Vitter won 51% of the vote, which allowed him to avoid a runoff election.

Post-congressional career

In February 2005, Breaux took a position as Distinguished Professor in the Douglas Manship School of Mass Communication at Louisiana State University in Baton Rouge. Since 2005, Breaux has been a lobbyist for Washington, DC, firm Squire Patton Boggs, specializing in issues of health care and energy law.

Since leaving office, Breaux has spearheaded his own national campaign, "Ceasefire on Health Care: Finding Common Ground for the Uninsured." Breaux coined the campaign name as a play on the CNN TV program Crossfire, which he points out has been canceled. Breaux has hosted multiple events with prominent members of both parties to establish a dialogue that will lead to real healthcare reform. Breaux developed the campaign alongside American University's Center for Congressional and Presidential Studies.

Beginning in February 2007, there was much speculation among Louisiana political commentators as to whether Breaux would announce his candidacy in the 2007 Louisiana governors' race. Breaux, arguably the most popular Democratic politician in Louisiana, was considering entering the race, if Blanco would be willing to step aside for Breaux. On March 20, 2007, Blanco announced that she would not run for re-election as governor. On March 29, 2007, John Breaux made his first Louisiana public appearance since speculation began concerning his potential candidacy. Breaux said that he intended to run, and would announce his candidacy as soon as Louisiana Attorney General Charles Foti, a Democrat, gave a formal legal opinion on whether Breaux was eligible to run. It was alleged that he would not meet the residency requirements to run for governor as he is registered to vote, and has listed his primary address in Maryland since 2005. At issue was the clause in the Louisiana constitution that states that a candidate for governor must be a 'citizen' of the State of Louisiana; what constitutes a citizen is not defined.

On April 13, 2007, Breaux released a statement that he would not be running for governor. Attorney-General Foti had declined to issue an opinion on Breaux's eligibility, stating it was an issue for the courts to decide. Breaux stated that he did not want the issue of eligibility to overshadow his campaign, as a court challenge would not occur until September.

Breaux also serves on the board of directors for CSX Transportation.

In 2021, Breaux was involved in efforts to lobby against taxation of large inheritances.

In Acadiana, and in honor of the legacy Breaux has left behind, a local Japanese restaurant chain named a sushi roll after him, the John Breaux, with crawfish and avocado.

References

External links

Bio from Ceasefire on Health Care website

|-

|-

|-

|-

|-

|-

|-

1944 births
21st-century American politicians
Cajun people
Democratic Party members of the United States House of Representatives from Louisiana
Democratic Party United States senators from Louisiana
Living people
Louisiana lawyers
Louisiana State University Law Center alumni
People from Crowley, Louisiana
University of Louisiana at Lafayette alumni
People associated with Squire Patton Boggs
Members of Congress who became lobbyists